The Official Opposition Shadow Cabinet of the 42nd Legislative Assembly of Ontario, Canada was the shadow cabinet of the main Opposition party, responsible for holding Ministers to account and for developing and disseminating the party's policy positions. In the 42nd Legislative Assembly of Ontario, which began in 2018 and ended in 2022, the Official Opposition was formed by the Ontario New Democratic Party.

A shuffle of the Shadow Cabinet was announced by the Ontario NDP in January to February 2021.

References

See also
Executive Council of Ontario
Liberal Party Shadow Cabinet of the 42nd Legislative Assembly of Ontario

Ontario New Democratic Party
Shadow cabinets